, is a Japanese actress and tarento who is a former member of the idol group AKB48's team A produced by Yasushi Akimoto. She debuted in 2007 with team B, joined team A in 2010, and returned to team B in 2012.

Katayama is represented with Irving.

AKB48 appearances

Singles

Stage units

Publications

Videos

Filmography

TV dramas

Variety

Other TV programmes

Films

Anime television

Stage

Advertisements

Radio

Video games

Internet

Events

Bibliography

Calendars

References

External links
 

AKB48 members
Japanese idols
Japanese women singers
Japanese musical theatre actresses
Japanese stage actresses
Japanese voice actresses
Actors from Aichi Prefecture
1990 births
Living people